Valery Kaplan (born 26 February 1943) is a retired Russian speed skater who won a bronze and a silver medal at the European championships in 1966 and 1967, respectively. He competed at the 1968 Winter Olympics in 500 m and 1,500 m and finished in 21st and 12th place, respectively. 

His personal bests were 
500 m – 39.8 (1968)
1000 m – 1:21.9 (1970)
1500 m – 2:04.3 (1968)
5000 m – 7:37.6 (1968)
10000 m – 16:07.5 (1966)

References

1943 births
Living people
Olympic speed skaters of the Soviet Union
Speed skaters at the 1968 Winter Olympics
Soviet male speed skaters